Banma County is  a county of southeastern Qinghai Province, China, bordering Sichuan to the south. It is the southernmost county-level division under the administration of Golog Tibetan Autonomous Prefecture. The Red Army of the Chinese Communist Party passed through Banma in 1936 during the Long March. The seat of Baima county is in Sailaitang Town.

It is home to Bennak, a Nyingma monastery of the Pelyul tradition, founded in 1824, which was visited by noted female teacher Sera Khandro. A 1992 work indicates that the 22 monasteries in the county are predominantly Nyingma.

Administrative divisions
Gadê is divided into one town and eight townships:

 Sailaitang Town
 Duogongma Township (多贡麻乡)
 Makehe Township (马可河乡)
 Jika Township (吉卡乡)
 Daka Township (达卡乡)
 Zhiqin Township  (知钦乡)
 Jiangritang Township (江日堂乡)
 Ya'ertang Township (亚尔堂乡)
 Dengta Township (灯塔乡)

Climate

See also
 List of administrative divisions of Qinghai

References

County-level divisions of Qinghai
Golog Tibetan Autonomous Prefecture